Citizenship of Finland can be obtained on the basis of birth, marriage of parents, adoption, or the place of birth. In addition, it may be acquired by application or by declaration to authorities. Finnish citizenship acquisition is based primarily on the legal principle of jus sanguinis. However, for many practical purposes, the concepts of municipal domicile and domicile in Finland are as important to the relation between the individual and the Finnish authorities as the individual's citizenship status.

Birth
A child acquires jus sanguinis Finnish citizenship at birth if:
 the child's mother is a Finnish citizen, however although this is now the case it is not historically true as nationality depends upon the date of birth of the child and the law in place at the time. In 1984, the children of Finnish mothers were granted automatic citizenship; 
 the child's father is a Finnish citizen and the parents are married;
 the child's father is a Finnish citizen, the child is born in Finland out of wedlock, and paternity has been established;
 the child's father who died before the child was born was a Finnish citizen and who was married to the child's mother at the time of his death; or
 the child's father, who died before the birth of the child, was a Finnish citizen and the child was born in Finland out of wedlock and the father's paternity was established.

Legitimation
A child who is born abroad and whose father is a Finnish citizen will acquire Finnish citizenship when the parents get married. If paternity has been established, the child will acquire Finnish citizenship as of the date of the marriage contract. If paternity is established after this point, the child will acquire Finnish citizenship as of the date on which paternity is established.

Adoption
A foreign adopted child under 12 years of age will automatically acquire Finnish citizenship if at least one of the adoptive parents is a Finnish citizen and if the adoption is recognised as valid in Finland. A local register office will enter the child's Finnish citizenship in the population register.

If the adoption decision was made prior to 1 June 2003, an adopted child under 12 years of age may apply for Finnish citizenship by declaration.  Application must be made on or before 31 May 2008.

An adopted child who is over 12 years old may apply for Finnish citizenship by declaration.

Naturalisation as a Finnish citizen

Finnish citizenship can be acquired by application or declaration:

Citizenship by application
A foreigner may be granted Finnish citizenship upon meeting certain requirements, including:

 four or five years continuous residence; or
 a total of seven years residence since age 15, with the last two years residence continuous; and
 knowledge of at least one of the 3 languages: Finnish, Swedish or Finnish sign language.

For those married to or in a registered partnership with a Finnish citizen for more than three years, the residence requirement is reduced to:

 four years continuous residence, or
 six years total residence since age 15 (with the last two years continuous)
 knowledge of at least one of the 3 languages: Finnish, Swedish or Finnish sign language.

These reduced residence requirements also apply to recognised refugees and stateless persons.

Former Finnish citizens and citizens of other Nordic countries are only required to have two years continuous residence in Finland.

The authorities have the right to refuse an application for citizenship by application even if the requirements are met.

Citizenship by declaration
Declaration is a simpler method of acquiring Finnish citizenship.   If the legal requirements are met it must be granted.

Categories of persons eligible for citizenship by declaration include:

Long-resident young persons
Persons aged between 18 and 23 may acquire Finnish citizenship by declaration if:

 resident in Finland for a total of 10 years (6 years if born in Finland); and
 domiciled in Finland; and
 not sentenced to imprisonment

Residence in another Nordic country before the age of 16 counts as residence in Finland (up to a maximum of 5 years). For males in the age group 18–23 years, getting the citizenship means becoming liable for conscription.

Citizens of Nordic countries
Citizens of other Nordic countries (Denmark, Sweden, Iceland and Norway) who are former Finnish citizens and have held a Nordic country citizenship continuously since then may acquire Finnish citizenship by declaration if domiciled in Finland.  There is no minimum residence requirement.

Otherwise the requirements are:

 the person is not a naturalised citizen of that country; and
 six years residence in Finland

A citizen of a Nordic country not eligible for citizenship by declaration may still be eligible for citizenship by application.

Ålandic provincial right of domicile 
People from the autonomous Finnish province of Åland, have provincial (Ålandic) right of domicile in addition to their national (Finnish) citizenship. The right of domicile is called hembygdsrätt (kotiseutuoikeus in Finnish) and it gives Ålanders the right to buy and own real estate, abstain from national service, vote for and be elected to the Lagting and set up a business on Åland. Ordinary Finns without a right of domicile have none of these rights in Åland.

Ordinary Finns can get Ålandic right of domicile after living on the islands for five years and proving their satisfactory knowledge of Swedish. Ålanders lose their right of domicile after living outside Åland for five years, or on forfeiting their Finnish citizenship.
Non-Finns can obtain Ålandic right of domicile when obtaining Finnish citizenship, if they fulfill the requirements for the right of domicile.

Municipal domicile and registration 
The Finnish law grants several rights, e.g. social services, municipal franchise and education on the basis of municipal domicile. The concept of municipal domicile is based on residency and is tied to citizenship only weakly. However, the naturalization legislation refers several times to the municipal domicile as a requirement for naturalization.

Registration of the municipal domicile 
As the main rule, the person is domiciled in their place of residence. A new-born is domiciled in the municipality of its mother. If a person has several residences, the place which he has closest ties to is their domicile. The ties may be related to work, family or other similar arrangements. The register authorities will determine the domicile of the person whose opinion cannot be resolved.

A person who leaves the country to stay abroad for more than a year, loses municipal domicile immediately. However, exceptions are made for persons who retain close ties to Finland or work as diplomats, missionaries or aid workers.

Finnish and EEA member state citizens are domiciled in their places of residence immediately if they move into the country from abroad. Aliens are domiciled if they have a permanent residence permission or if they are family members of a person domiciled in Finland. Other aliens are domiciled if they have a temporary residence permit for at least a year and the reasons for their stay point that they might remain in the country. Any family members of a person with a municipal domicile are also domiciled in the municipality if they live together. All foreigners with a municipal domicile are also required to register into the national population database.

When moving, the person's domicile will not change if the move has been caused by
temporary work, study, illness or other similar reason that will not last for more than a year
care in a hospital, sanatorium, nursing home, asylum etc.
professional seafaring
detention in a penitentiary
membership of the parliament or membership of the European Parliament
service as a conscript

Any person who is domiciled in Finland is obliged to inform the registry office on moving permanently or temporarily within seven days from the move. Also persons who move from a residence without having any new address are required to report the change. Failure to report moves is punishable by 50 euro administrative fine.

Effects of municipal domicile
The main political right tied to municipal domicile is the municipal suffrage. Finnish and Nordic citizens have the municipal voting right and eligibility in the municipality where they had domicile 51 days prior to election day. Other foreigners have the municipal suffrage if they have had Finnish municipal domicile for the last two years. Administratively, the municipal domicile is one of the most important factors in determining the jurisdiction of different state authorities over the person.

The municipal and church tax are the most important duties based on the municipal domicile. During the calendar year, the person pays tax to the municipality where they were domiciled on 31 December of the preceding year. If the person belongs to the Evangelical Lutheran Church of Finland or to the Finnish Orthodox Church, they belong to the parish of their domicile and pay church tax to the domicile parish of the 31 December of the preceding year. Another duty tied to the municipal domicile is the duty to accept a position in municipal board, if the municipal council elects the person to a board.

Municipal domicile grants also other than political rights. Most social and health services are provided by the municipalities to their residents, while persons not domiciled in the municipality enjoy much less protection. In addition to the social and health services, the municipal domicile may yield other, somewhat less important rights relating to natural resources. In state-owned lake water area (in major lakes) and on state-owned lake islands, all persons domiciled in municipalities by the lake are empowered to hunt. The same applies to state-owned land in Northern Finland, where persons domiciled there may hunt in the state-owned forests of their home municipality. Another Northern peculiarity of municipal domicile is reindeer ownership, which is restricted to EEA citizens domiciled in the municipalities of the reindeer herding region.

Domicile in Finland
With regard to the social protections provided by the Finnish state instead of municipalities, the basis for eligibility for benefits and grants is domicile in Finland. Among the social protections meant here are e.g. maternity and paternity leave pay, child grant, unemployment benefits and other forms of social insurance.

Although similarly worded, the definition used is not exactly the same as for the determination of municipal domicile. In particular, the municipal domicile alone does not make an alien or citizen domiciled in Finland. The domicile in Finland requires factual residence and home in Finland, as well as permanent and continued physical presence in the country. This applies to foreigners and citizens alike. Persons moving into Finland may be considered domiciled in Finland immediately if they actually intend to remain in the country. This means that not even a Finnish citizen moving into Finland is guaranteed the state social benefits immediately after entry, unless they can show that they intend to remain.

On the other hand, the concept of "domicile in Finland" allows for more consideration than the mechanistic definition municipal domicile. Students, missionaries, scholars, scientists, aid workers, officials of international organizations and employees of Finnish companies, as well as their family members may retain their domicile in Finland indefinitely even if they lose their municipal domicile. However, the Kela, which determines the domicile status, has a wide leeway to judge the circumstances of individuals.

A foreigner with both municipal domicile and a domicile in Finland enjoys all social and health services provided to Finnish citizens.

Loss of Finnish citizenship
Although dual citizenship is permitted, a Finnish citizen who is a citizen of another country will lose Finnish citizenship at age 22 unless he or she has sufficiently close ties with Finland.

Persons with close ties include those:

 born in Finland and domiciled there on their 22nd birthday
 with a total of seven years residence in Finland or another Nordic country
 to whom a Finnish passport or a Finnish national identity card was issued between the ages of 18 and 21
 who have completed military or non-military service in Finland between the ages of 18 and 21
 who have submitted a declaration of retention of Finnish citizenship between the ages of 18 and 21 to the appropriate authorities in Finland or to a Finland diplomatic mission overseas. Renunciation of foreign citizenship is not required.

Finnish citizens may also lose citizenship if they formally petition for permission to renounce it. To prevent statelessness, Finnish citizenship may be renounced only if the person proves that they are a citizen of another state.

While losing Finnish citizenship is rare, the benefits of citizenship for persons residing abroad without close ties to Finland are few. A citizen without domicile in Finland and without municipal domicile has no rights to Finnish social security, to Finnish consular help in personal emergencies, or to Finnish health services. The most important remaining rights are the absolute right to return to Finland, to vote in national elections, to have a Finnish passport, to work in the European Union without the working visa requirements faced by non-European Union citizens, and to enroll in Scandinavian universities as a European Union citizen (waiving university fees). In addition, all Finnish citizens have the right to receive consular protection from Finnish foreign missions in case of a major crisis in the host country or in case of arrest or incarceration. However, if a Finnish citizen is also a citizen of the host country, Finnish foreign missions will not act on his behalf.

Dual citizenship
With effect from 1 June 2003, a Finnish citizen acquiring a foreign citizenship does not lose Finnish citizenship.

Former Finnish citizens who lost Finnish citizenship prior to this date (upon naturalisation in another country) may re-acquire Finnish citizenship by declaration.  Children of former Finnish citizens may also acquire Finnish citizenship by declaration. The deadline for submission of applications was 31 May 2008.

As of July 2005, over 5000 people had acquired or resumed Finnish citizenship under this new provision.

The changes to the law also mean that foreigners seeking naturalisation as a Finnish citizen do not need to renounce their former citizenship.   They may retain it if the law of the other country permits them to do so.

Effective 1 May 2019, individuals with dual citizenship can be deprived of their citizenship should they be sentenced for serious crimes which can lead to eight years prison. Given examples of such were terrorism, treason, hostage taking, people smuggling, inciting to war and espionage. The decision on whether to cancel the Finnish citizenship will be taken by the Finnish Immigration Service. The law is not retroactive and therefore does not encompass people with Finnish citizenship who have joined the Islamic State of Iraq and the Levant.

In early 2022, the Finns Party called for dual citizenship to be abolished in Finland. a few mounths later a MP from the National Coalition Party called for a law banning non-native Finnish citizens/dual nationals from holding positions vital to national security, including police officers. He would later withdraw the bill.

Citizenship of the European Union
Because Finland forms part of the European Union, Finnish citizens are also citizens of the European Union under European Union law and thus enjoy rights of free movement and have the right to vote in elections for the European Parliament. When in a non-EU country where there is no Finnish embassy, Finnish citizens have the right to get consular protection from the embassy of any other EU country present in that country. Finnish citizens can live and work in any country within the EU as a result of the right of free movement and residence granted in Article 21 of the EU Treaty.

Travel freedom of Finnish citizens

Visa requirements for Finnish citizens are administrative entry restrictions by the authorities of other states placed on citizens of Finland. In 2020, Finnish citizens had visa-free or visa-on-arrival access to 188 countries and territories, ranking the Finnish passport fourth in the world according to the Visa Restrictions Index.

The Finnish nationality is ranked eighth in The Quality of Nationality Index (QNI). This index differs from the Visa Restrictions Index, which focuses on external factors including travel freedom. In addition to travel freedom the QNI considers internal factors such as peace & stability, economic strength, and human development.

See also
Finland
Nationality
Citizenship
Nationality law
Passport
Multiple citizenship

References

External links 
 Directorate of Immigration
 An unofficial English translation of the Nationality Act 2003 (a pdf file)

 
Finland and the European Union